Michael Plowden (1958 - Pinhal Novo – 28 February 2008) was an American-born Portuguese naturalized basketball player and coach. He played as a power forward.

Plowden came to Portugal still in his 20s to play for Barreirense. He later would represent Benfica, in the best years of his career, winning several National Champion titles and the Cup of Portugal. Also important, in the last years of its career as a professional player, namely for its social and regional impact in the divulgation of basketball, was its passage by the club representing Alentejo Region: Juventude Sport Clube, from Évora, Portugal.

He was capped 61 times for Portugal, since 1988.

Plowden, after ending his player career, become a coach. He died suddenly while coaching Quintajense, at his team pavilion.

1958 births
2008 deaths
American men's basketball coaches
American men's basketball players
Portuguese basketball coaches
Portuguese men's basketball players
Power forwards (basketball)
Saginaw Valley State Cardinals men's basketball players
S.L. Benfica basketball players

Portuguese people of American descent